Duke of Richmond is a title in the Peerage of England that has been created four times in British history. It has been held by members of the royal Tudor and Stuart families.

The current dukedom of Richmond was created in 1675 for Charles Lennox, the illegitimate son of King Charles II of England and one of his mistresses, the Breton noblewoman Louise de Penancoët de Kérouaille; Charles Lennox was also made Duke of Lennox a month later. The Duke of Richmond and Lennox was furthermore created Duke of Gordon in the Peerage of the United Kingdom in 1876, meaning that the Duke holds three dukedoms— plus, in pretence, the French Duchy of Aubigny-sur-Nère.

History of the Dukedom
Prior to the creation of the Dukedom the early nobles of England associated with Richmondshire were Lords and Earls of Richmond. At times the honour of Richmond was held without a title. The Dukedom of Richmond emerged under King Henry VIII.

The first creation of a dukedom of Richmond (as Duke of Richmond and Somerset) was made in 1525 for Henry FitzRoy, an illegitimate son of King Henry VIII. His mother was Elizabeth Blount. Upon the Duke's death without children in 1536, his titles became extinct.

The second creation was in 1623 for Ludovic Stuart, 2nd Duke of Lennox (see Lennox (district)) (1574–1624), who also held other titles in the peerage of Scotland. He was created Earl of Richmond and Baron Settrington in 1613 and Duke of Richmond in the peerage of England in 1623 as a member of the Lennox line (not unlike King James himself) in the House of Stuart. These became extinct at his death in 1624, but his Scottish honours devolved on his brother Esmé, Earl of March, who thus became 3rd Duke of Lennox in the peerage of Scotland. Esmé's son James, 4th Duke of Lennox (1612–1655) subsequently received the third creation of the dukedom of Richmond in 1641, when the two dukedoms again became united. In 1672, on the death of James' nephew Charles, 3rd Duke of Richmond and 6th Duke of Lennox, both titles again became extinct.

The fourth creation of the dukedom of Richmond was in August 1675, when Charles II granted the title to Charles Lennox, his illegitimate son by Louise de Keroualle, Duchess of Portsmouth. Charles Lennox was further created Duke of Lennox a month later. Charles' son, also Charles, succeeded to the French title Duke of Aubigny (of Aubigny-sur-Nère) on the death of his grandmother in 1734. The 6th Duke of Richmond and Lennox was created Duke of Gordon (See Clan Gordon) in 1876. Thus, the Duke holds three (four, if the French Aubigny claim is accepted) dukedoms, more than any other person in the realm.

The subsidiary titles of the dukedom created in 1675 are Earl of March (created 1675), Earl of Darnley (1675), Earl of Kinrara (1876), Baron Settrington, of Settrington in the County of York (1675), and Lord Torbolton (1675).

The Dukes of Richmond, Lennox and Gordon are normally styled Duke of Richmond and Gordon. Before the creation of the Dukedom of Gordon they were styled Duke of Richmond and Lennox. The titles Earl of March and Baron Settrington were created in the peerage of England along with the Dukedom of Richmond. The titles Earl of Darnley and Lord Torbolton were created in the Peerage of Scotland along with the Dukedom of Lennox. Finally, the title Earl of Kinrara was created in the peerage of the United Kingdom with the Dukedom of Gordon. The eldest son of the Duke uses the courtesy title Earl of March and Kinrara. Before the creation of the Dukedom of Gordon, the courtesy title used was Earl of March.

The family seat is Goodwood House near Chichester, West Sussex.

Dukes of Richmond and Somerset (1525)

Dukes of Richmond (1623)

Dukes of Richmond (1641)

Dukes of Richmond (1675)

The heir apparent is Charles Henry Gordon-Lennox, Earl of March and Kinrara (b. 1994), eldest son of the 11th Duke.

Line of succession (simplified)

  Charles Gordon-Lennox, 6th Duke of Richmond (1818–1903)
  Charles Gordon-Lennox, 7th Duke of Richmond (1845–1928)
  Charles Gordon-Lennox, 8th Duke of Richmond (1870–1935)
  Frederick Gordon-Lennox, 9th Duke of Richmond (1904–1989)
  Charles Gordon-Lennox, 10th Duke of Richmond (1929–2017)
 Charles Gordon-Lennox, 11th Duke of Richmond (born 1955)
 (1) Charles Henry Gordon-Lennox, Earl of March and Kinrara (b. 1994)
 (2) Lord William Rupert Gordon-Lennox (b. 1996)
 (3) Lord Frederick Lysander Gordon-Lennox (b. 2000)
Lord Esmé Charles Gordon-Lennox (1875–1949)
Reginald Arthur Charles Gordon-Lennox (1910–1965)
male issue in line
Lord Bernard Charles Gordon-Lennox (1878–1914)
Sir George Gordon-Lennox (1908–1988)
Bernard Gordon Lennox (1932–2017)
male issue in line
other male issue in line
Sir Alexander Henry Charles Gordon-Lennox (1911–1987)
male issue in line
Lord Walter Gordon-Lennox (1865–1922)
Victor Charles Hugh Gordon-Lennox (1897–1968)
male issue in line

Coat of arms (full achievement)

The earlier dukes (creations of 1623 and 1641) bore: Quarterly 1 and 4 azure three fleurs-de-lis and a bordure engrailed Or; 2 and 3 Or a fess chequy azure and argent, a bordure gules semy of buckles Or (Stewart of Bonkyl); overall an inescutcheon of Lennox.  

Henry Fitzroy, Duke of Richmond and Somerset (creation of 1525), bore the Tudor royal arms (quarterly France and England) with a border quarterly ermine (for Brittany) and compony azure and argent (for Somerset), a baton sinister argent for bastardy, and overall an escutcheon of Nottingham.

Family tree

See also
Earl of Newcastle

Notes

References

Further reading
 
 Tillyard, Stella. Aristocrats: Caroline, Emily, Louisa, and Sarah Lennox, 1740–1832. Farrar, Straus & Giroux, 1994.
 Baird, Rosemary. Goodwood: Art and Architecture, Sport and Family, Frances Lincoln, 2007

 
Dukedoms in the Peerage of England
Noble titles created in 1623
Noble titles created in 1641
Noble titles created in 1675